The third season of the South Korean reality television series The Voice of Korea premiered in May 2020 after a seven-year hiatus. Sung Sikyung, Kim Jongkook, BoA, and Dynamic Duo were introduced as the new coaches of the show. The show is hosted by Jang Sungkyu.

Changes

Coaches' line-up

None of the coaches from the previous season has returned. In April 2020, Sung Sikyung, Kim Jongkook, BoA, and Dynamic Duo were announced as the four new coaches.

Host
Jang Sungkyu was announced as the new host, replacing Kim Jinpyo.

Mechanics

Block
A new feature added in the blind auditions this season is the Block. Each coach is given one block to prevent one coach from getting an artist. Also, each teams were decreased from 12 to 8 members each, bringing the total of artists to 32.

The Sing-Offs
The Knockout rounds were removed in favor of the Sing-Offs. In the Sing-Offs, one artist from each team is chosen by their coach to directly advance to the semi-finals without performing. The remaining artists perform a short piece in a capella. The winning artist proceeds to the semi-finals.

Teams
 Color key

Blind auditions
A new feature in the blind auditions this season is the Block. Each coach can use it once to prevent one of the other coaches from getting an artist.

The blind auditions were taped without an audience due to the COVID-19 pandemic in South Korea.
Color key

Episode 1 (May 29, 2020)

Episode 2 (June 5, 2020)

Episode 3 (June 12, 2020)

Episode 4 (June 19, 2020)

The Battles
The advisors for this round are Kim Johan for Team Sung Sikyung, Lyn for Team Kim Jongkook, Jang Jin-young for Team BoA, and Sunwoo Junga for Team Dynamic Duo. Artists who win their battle advance to the Sing-Off Rounds.

Color key:

The Sing-Offs
In the Sing-Offs, one artist from each team is chosen by their coach to directly advance to the semi-finals without having to perform on this round. The remaining artists perform a short piece in a capella. The winning artist proceeds to the semi-finals.

Color key

Live shows

Semi-final (July 10, 2020)
Color key

Final (July 10, 2020)
Color key:

Ratings

References

External links
 The Voice of Korea 2020 homepage

Season 3